Elizabeth Pattinson (born 14 November 1983) is an English singer and songwriter.

Early and personal life
Pattinson was born on 14 November 1983 in London. She is the second of three children to her parents. Pattinson has an older sister, Victoria, and younger brother, actor Robert Pattinson. She attended Wimbledon High School, London. In January 2016 she married her long-time partner, professional climber John Oliver Dunthorne II.

Career
Pattinson has performed with the UK dance act Aurora and German duo Milk & Sugar, for which she was lead vocalist on the latter's No. 1 Billboard Hot Dance Club Play track "Let The Sun Shine".

In 2008, Pattinson recorded background vocals for the movie Twilight, in which her brother Robert had starred as vampire, Edward Cullen. Her vocals can be heard on the track "Who Are They?" by Carter Burwell. In 2011, Pattinson recorded vocals once again with Burwell for The Twilight Saga: Breaking Dawn – Part 1 at Abbey Road Studios.

In 2014, she participated in the eleventh series of The X Factor. She reached the top 6 in her category (the contestants older than 25 years old, the "Over 25s" group, mentored by Simon Cowell) but was eliminated from the show at the judges' houses.

See also
List of number-one dance hits (United States)
List of artists who reached number one on the US Dance chart

References

External links

1983 births
Living people
21st-century English singers
21st-century English women singers
British house musicians
English dance musicians
English women singer-songwriters
People educated at Wimbledon High School
Singers from London